Cote Bonneville is a registered historic building in Cincinnati, Ohio, listed in the National Register on November 29, 1984.

Historic uses 
Single Dwelling
Clubhouse
Church Related Residence

Notes 

National Register of Historic Places in Cincinnati
Houses on the National Register of Historic Places in Ohio
Houses completed in 1902
Houses in Cincinnati